Mario Mola (born 23 February 1990 in Palma de Mallorca), is a Spanish professional triathlete. He is the 2016, 2017 and 2018 ITU World Triathlon Series World Champion. He has placed 19th at the London Olympic Games 2012, 8th at the Rio Olympic Games 2016 and 10th at the Tokyo Olympic Games 2020. In addition to his World Triathlon Series wins, he has placed second and third in 2014 and 2015 ITU World Triathlon Series.

Sports career 

Mola began swimming at five years old in Palma de Mallorca, where he grew up. But it wasn't before the age of 15 that started riding on a racing bike. Mola started to take part in junior triathlons in 2005. From 2006 on he has been a member of the Spanish National Team. Since 2008 he belongs to the world's best triathlon athletes in the world. In France, he represented ECS Triathlon in the Club Championship Series Grand Prix de Triathlon.

In 2009, Mola became Triathlon Junior World Champion. In France, at the club championship series Grand Prix de Triathlon, Mola competed for the E.C. Sartrouville. In Germany, Mola competed in the first league for the club EJOT Buschütten. In Düsseldorf (8 of July 2012) he won the gold medal.

In 2012 he competed in the  Olympic Games, placing 19th place in London. In June 2013 he landed in third place at the Olympic distance European Championship.

Mola placed second overall 2014 ITU World Triathlon Series behind fellow Spanish competitor Javier Gomez. In March 2015 he won the starting race of the season in Abu Dhabi. In September in the same year, he also won the last race of the season in Chicago. Again, he placed second overall, behind Javier Gomez in the 2015 ITU World Triathlon Series.

In March 2016, he won the ITU WTS Series race in Abu Dhabi. At the Rio Olympic Games he competed for Spain, placing 8th place.

ITU Triathlon world champion 

In Mexico at the last race of the 2016 season Mola landed in 5th place and was crowned short distance triathlon world champion. He beat Jonathan Brownlee by 4 points.

In 2017, the 27 year old Mola successfully defended his title with four wins in nine races and repeated as world champion in the 2017 ITU World Triathlon Series. and was nominated ETU athlete of the year 2017. In 2018, at the grand final in Australia, he was crowned world champion for the third time in a row. Additionally, with a total of 197.000 Us-Dollar, Mario Mola was leading the prize money ranking of the season 2018.

Mola is married to the Catalan triathlon athlete Carolina Routier and is studying economics besides his professional career as an athlete.

ITU results 
Mola's ITU race results are:

DNF = did not finish · DNS = did not start · DQ = disqualified

References

External links 
 Mario Mola's Official Homepage 
Mario Mola profile at the Institut für Angewandte Trainingswissenschaft
Mario Mola ITU athlete profile
Mario Mola profila at sports-reference

Spanish male triathletes
1990 births
Living people
Olympic triathletes of Spain
Triathletes at the 2012 Summer Olympics
Triathletes at the 2016 Summer Olympics
Sportspeople from Palma de Mallorca
Triathletes at the 2020 Summer Olympics
20th-century Spanish people
21st-century Spanish people